The  white-spotted moray (Gymnothorax johnsoni) is a moray eel found in the western Indian Ocean. It was first named by Smith in 1962.

References

johnsoni
Fish described in 1962